This is a list of cemeteries in New York.

Cemeteries in New York

A
 Acacia Cemetery, Ozone Park, Queens
 Agudas Achim Cemetery, Livingston Manor
 Agudat Achim Cemetery, Rotterdam
 Agudath Achim Cemetery, East Setauket
 Ahavath Israel Cemetery, Liberty 
 Albany Rural Cemetery, Menands (one of the oldest in New York) 
 Albany Diocesan Cemeteries
 Assumption Cemetery, Syracuse

B
 Bard College Cemetery, Annadale-on-Hudson 
 Baron Hirsch Cemetery, Graniteville, Staten Island
 Batavia Cemetery, Batavia 
 Bayside Cemetery, Ozone Park, Queens
 Beechwoods Cemetery, New Rochelle
 Bentley Cemetery, Lakewood 
 Beth David Cemetery, Elmont, Long Island
 Beth Moses Cemetery, West Babylon
 Beth El Cemetery (New Union Field), Ridgewood, Queens 
 Beth Olom Cemetery, Brooklyn and Queens
 Breslau Cemetery, Lindenhurst
 Brick Church Cemetery, New Hempstead, New York

C 
 Calvary Cemetery, Woodside, Queens 
 Cedar Grove Cemetery (Queens, New York), Flushing, Queens
 Cedar Hill Cemetery and Mausoleum, Newburgh 
 Cedar Lawn Cemetery, East Hampton 
 Cemetery of the Evergreens, Brooklyn 
 Cemetery of the Holy Rood, Westbury, New York
 Chesed Shel Emes Cemetery, Liberty
 Cold Springs Cemetery, near Carlisle Gardens
 Colden Family Cemetery, in the town of Montgomery.
 Cypress Hills Cemetery, Brooklyn and Queens

E 
 Elmont Cemetery (Elmont, New York)
 Evergreen Cemetery (Pine Plains, New York)

F
 Ferncliff Cemetery, Hartsdale 
 Ferndale Cemetery, Johnstown
 First Shearith Israel Graveyard (Chatham Square Cemetery), Chinatown, Manhattan
 Flushing Cemetery, Queens 
 Forest Lawn Cemetery, Buffalo 
 Forest Park Cemetery, Brunswick
 Fort Hill Cemetery, Auburn 
 Friends Quaker Cemetery, Brooklyn

G
 Gate of Heaven Cemetery, Hawthorne 
 Gerald B. H. Solomon Saratoga National Cemetery, Stillwater
 Good Ground Cemetery, Hampton Bays
 Goodleburg Cemetery, Wales
 Green River Cemetery, Springs 
 Green-Wood Cemetery, Brooklyn 
 Greenwood Union Cemetery, Rye
 Grove Cemetery, Trumansburg

H
 Holy Sepulchre Cemetery, New Rochelle
 Holy Sepulchre Cemetery, Rochester 
 Hungarian Union Field Cemetery, Glendale, Queens
 Huntington Rural Cemetery, Huntington 
 Independent Jewish Cemetery Association, Sag Harbor

J
 Jewish Association of United Brethren Cemetery, Sag Harbor

K
 Kensico Cemetery, Valhalla 
 Kinderhook Reformed Church Cemetery, Kinderhook 
 Kings Park Jewish Cemetery, Kings Park
 Knollwood Park Cemetery, Ridgewood, Queens

L
 Lake View Cemetery, Ithaca 
 Lake View Cemetery, Interlaken
 Lake View Cemetery, Jamestown
 Liberty Cemetery, Liberty
 Linden Hill Cemetery, Ridgewood, Queens
 Locust Valley Cemetery, Locust Valley, New York 
 Long Island National Cemetery, East Farmingdale 
 Lutheran All Faiths Cemetery, Middle Village, Queens

M
 Machpelah Cemetery, Le Roy
 Machpelah Cemetery, Ridgewood, Queens 
 Maimonides Cemetery, Cypress Hills, Brooklyn
 Maimonides Cemetery, Elmont
 Maple Grove Cemetery, Kew Gardens, Queens
 Melville Cemetery, Melville
 Middle Patent Rural Cemetery, Bedford 
 Mokom Sholom Cemetery, Ozone Park, Queens
 Monfort Cemetery, Port Washington
 Montefiore Cemetery, Springfield Gardens, Queens 
 Moravian Cemetery, New Dorp, Staten Island 
 Mount Albion Cemetery, Albion
 Mount Ararat Cemetery, Farmingdale
 Mount Calvary Cemetery, White Plains 
 Mount Carmel Cemetery, Glendale, Queens 
 Mount Golda Cemetery, Huntington Station
 Mount Hebron Cemetery, Flushing, Queens
 Mount Holiness Church Cemetery, Inwood 
 Mount Hope Cemetery, Cypress Hills, Brooklyn
 Mount Hope Cemetery, Rochester 
 Mount Judah Cemetery, Ridgewood, Queens
 Mount Lebanon Cemetery, Ridgewood, Queens
 Mount Neboh Cemetery, Glendale, Queens
 Mount Olivet Cemetery, Maspeth, Queens
 Mount Pleasant Cemetery, Hawthorne 
 Mount Richmond Cemetery, Staten Island (second cemetery of the Hebrew Free Burial Association)
 Mount St. Mary Cemetery, Flushing, Queens
 Mount Zion Cemetery, Maspeth, Queens

N
 Nassau Knolls Cemetery, Port Washington
 National September 11 Memorial & Museum, New York City
 New Montefiore Cemetery, West Babylon, New York 
 New Paltz Rural Cemetery, New Paltz 
 New York Marble Cemetery, East Village, Manhattan, the oldest non-sectarian cemetery in New York City
 New York City Marble Cemetery, East Village, Manhattan, the second oldest non-sectarian cemetery in New York City.
 North Babylon Cemetery, Babylon

O
Oak Hill Cemetery, Nyack, New York
Oakland Cemetery, Sag Harbor 
Oakwood Cemetery, Bay Shore
Oakwood Cemetery, Niagara Falls 
Oakwood Cemetery, Syracuse
Oakwood Cemetery, Troy 
Ocean View Cemetery, Staten Island
Old Colonial Cemetery, Johnstown 
Old Liberty Cemetery, Liberty
Old Sloatsburg Cemetery, Sloatsburg
 Old Town Cemetery, Newburgh
Oswego Meeting House and Friends' Cemetery, Moore's Mill

P
 Patchogue Hebrew Cemetery, Holbrook
 Pinelawn Memorial Park, Farmingdale 
 Pleasant Lawn Cemetery, Parish
 Poughkeepsie Rural Cemetery, Poughkeepsie
 Pound Ridge Cemetery, Pound Ridge

R
 Rensselaerville Cemetery, Rensselaerville
 Revolutionary War Cemetery, Salem
 Rockville Cemetery, Rockville Centre, New York
 Rose Hills Memorial Park, Putnam Valley
 Roslyn Cemetery, Greenvale

S
 Sacred Hearts Cemetery, Southampton 
 Saint Agnes Cemetery, Lake Placid
 Saint Anthony's Lutheran Cemetery, Sanborn
 Saint Bartholomew's Episcopal Church, Manhattan 
 Saint Charles Cemetery, East Farmingdale 
 St. James Church Cemetery, Hyde Park, New York
 St. John Cemetery, Middle Village 
 Saint Mary’s Cemetery, Troy – Maureen Stapleton
 Saint Patrick’s Cemetery, Watervliet 
 Saint Peter's Cemetery, West New Brighton, Staten Island.  Oldest Catholic Cemetery on Staten Island, dating from 1848.
 Saint Peter's Cemetery, Liberty
 Saint Peter's Cemetery, Poughkeepsie
 Saint Peter's Episcopal Cemetery, Lithgow
 Saint Raymond's Cemetery, Throggs Neck, The Bronx 
 Salem Fields Cemetery, Cypress Hills, Brooklyn 
 Sandusky Cemetery, Sandusky, Cattaraugus County
 Second Shearith Israel Cemetery, Manhattan
 Shaarey Pardes Accabonic Grove Cemetery, East Hampton
 Silver Lake Cemetery, Staten Island (first cemetery of the Hebrew Free Burial Association)
 Sleepy Hollow Cemetery, Sleepy Hollow 
 Sparta Cemetery, Ossining
 Sullivan County Veteran's Cemetery, Liberty
 Swan Lake Synagogue Cemetery, Liberty

T
 Third Shearith Israel Cemetery, Manhattan
 Trinity Church Cemetery, New York City

U
 Union Cemetery, Fort Edward
 Union Field Cemetery, Ridgewood, Queens 
 United Hebrew Cemetery, Staten Island
 United Synagogue Cemetery, Calverton

V
 Vale Cemetery, Schenectady

W
 Washington Cemetery, Mapleton, Brooklyn, New York City
 Washington Memorial Park, Mount Sinai
 Wellwood Cemetery, West Babylon
 West Farms Soldiers Cemetery, West Farms, The Bronx, New York City
 West Hill Cemetery, Sherburne
 West Point Cemetery, West Point 
 Westchester Hills Cemetery, Hastings-on-Hudson 
 Westhampton Cemetery, Westhampton 
 White Plains Rural Cemetery, White Plains 
 Witmer Road Cemetery, Niagara Falls
 Woodlawn Cemetery, The Bronx, New York City 
 Woodlawn Cemetery, Elmira 
 Woodlawn Cemetery, New Windsor
 Woodlawn Cemetery, Syracuse, New York
 Woodlands Cemetery, Cambridge, New York
 Woodstock Cemetery, Woodstock

Y
Youngs Memorial Cemetery, Oyster Bay

See also
 List of cemeteries in the United States

References

Cemeteries in New York (state)
New York